Aino Sibelius (née Järnefelt; 10 August 1871 – 8 June 1969) was the wife of Finnish composer Jean Sibelius. They lived most of their 65 years of marriage at their home Ainola near Lake Tuusula, Järvenpää, Finland. They had six daughters: Eva (1893–1978), Ruth (1894–1976), Kirsti (1898–1900), Katarina (1903–1984), Margareta (1908–1988) and Heidi (1911–1982).

Biography

Childhood
Aino Järnefelt was born in Helsinki, into the strict and disciplined family of General Alexander Järnefelt and his wife Elisabeth (née Clodt von Jürgensburg) in 1871. She had six older siblings, including the writer Arvid Järnefelt, the painter Eero Järnefelt and the composer and conductor Armas Järnefelt. 

It was her brother Armas who brought his friend and fellow student, Jean Sibelius, to the family home in the winter of 1889. At the time, the writer Juhani Aho was expressing affection towards Aino, but he did not receive the response he sought. Within the next few years, Aino became engaged to Jean Sibelius, and they were married with her father's blessing at Maxmo on 10 June 1892.

1892–1930: Early married life
From the time of their engagement they had talked of a house of their own in the country, and had looked for a house near Lake Tuusula as early as 1898. They moved there in the autumn of 1904, having borrowed a substantial amount of money to buy the land and build the house.

Aino's early years in Järvenpää were stressful and difficult, caused partly by financial worries and partly by her husband's drinking and partying lifestyle. She sought to eke out the family budget by creating a vegetable garden from the stony ground near the house. And since they could not afford schooling for the children, Aino taught them at home, a task which she performed very successfully, since they all did well when they later went to school. She spent a period in 1907 convalescing in Hyvinkää Sanatorium.

In 1908 her husband had a throat operation and gave up alcohol for almost seven years, and this was the start of Aino's happiest years. Margareta was born in 1908, then Heidi in 1911 (when Aino was 40 years old), and the children all grew up in Ainola – the only time they lived elsewhere was during the Finnish Civil War in 1918 when they had to move to Helsinki for a couple of months.

1930–1957: Later life
By the 1930s the children had all left home, and Aino wanted to move to Helsinki, nearer to their children. During the next few years they spent some time in a rented apartment in Helsinki, but in 1941 they moved back to Ainola with their many grandchildren because of the risk of bombing by the Soviet Union. Jean and Aino Sibelius lived there for the rest of their days, where Aino continued to devote herself to her husband and family, and to her vegetable garden.

1957–1969: Life as a widow

Jean Sibelius died at Ainola, Järvenpää, on 20 September 1957 and is buried in a garden there.  Aino continued to live in Ainola after his death; she sorted out family papers and helped Santeri Levas and Erik W. Tawaststjerna who were writing biographies of her late husband. She died at Ainola on 8 June 1969, some two months before her 98th birthday, and is buried there with Jean.

In 1972 Jean Sibelius's daughters, Eva, Ruth, Katarina, Margareta, and Heidi, sold Ainola to the Finnish State and it was opened to the public as a museum in 1974.

In her own words
She wrote about their life together:

Correspondence
Aino Sibelius' correspondence has been published:

Sources

References

External links

Ainola – The home of Aino and Jean Sibelius

1871 births
1969 deaths
People from Helsinki
People from Uusimaa Province (Grand Duchy of Finland)
Finnish people of German descent
19th-century Finnish nobility
Sibelius family
19th-century Finnish writers
20th-century Finnish nobility
20th-century Finnish women